Polyschisis is a genus of beetles in the family Cerambycidae, containing the following species:

 Polyschisis hirtipes (Olivier, 1792)
 Polyschisis melanaria White, 1853
 Polyschisis rufitarsalis Waterhouse, 1880
 Polyschisis tucumana Di Iorio, 2003

References

Trachyderini
Cerambycidae genera